A namba is a traditional penis sheath from Vanuatu. Nambas are wrapped around the penis of the wearer, sometimes as their only clothing. Two tribes on Malakula, the Big Nambas and the Smol (Small) Nambas, are named for the size of their nambas.

Nambas are characteristic of central Vanuatu. In the northern islands, long mats wrapped around the waist are worn instead.

See also
Big Nambas language
Koteka
Kynodesme
Land diving

References

Vanuatuan culture
Human penis
Undergarments
Minimalist clothing
Bislama words and phrases